Richard Bruce Cheney (born January 30, 1941) is an American politician and businessman who served as the 46th vice president of the United States from 2001 to 2009 under President George W. Bush. He is currently the oldest living former U.S. vice president, following the death of Walter Mondale in 2021.

Born in Lincoln, Nebraska, Cheney grew up there and in Casper, Wyoming. He attended Yale University before earning a bachelor of arts and master of arts in political science from the University of Wyoming. He began his political career as an intern for Congressman William A. Steiger, eventually working his way into the White House during the Nixon and Ford administrations. He served as White House chief of staff from 1975 to 1977. In 1978, he was elected to the U.S. House of Representatives, and represented Wyoming's at-large congressional district from 1979 to 1989, briefly serving as House minority whip in 1989. He was selected as Secretary of Defense during the presidency of George H. W. Bush, and held the position for most of Bush's term from 1989 to 1993. During his time there, he oversaw 1991's Operation Desert Storm, among other actions. Out of office during the Clinton administration, he was the chairman and CEO of Halliburton from 1995 to 2000.

In July 2000, Cheney was chosen by presumptive Republican presidential nominee George W. Bush as his running mate in the 2000 presidential election. They defeated their Democratic opponents, incumbent Vice President Al Gore and Senator Joe Lieberman. In 2004, Cheney was reelected to his second term as vice president with Bush as president, defeating their Democratic opponents Senators John Kerry and John Edwards. During Cheney's tenure as vice president, he played a leading behind-the-scenes role in the George W. Bush administration's response to the September 11 attacks and coordination of the Global War on Terrorism. He was an early proponent of invading Iraq, alleging that the Saddam Hussein regime possessed a weapons of mass destruction program and had an operational relationship with Al-Qaeda; however, neither allegation was ever substantiated. He also pressured the intelligence community to provide intelligence consistent with the administration's rationales for invading Iraq. Cheney was often criticized for the Bush Administration's policies regarding the campaign against terrorism, for his support of wiretapping by the National Security Agency (NSA) and for his endorsement of "enhanced interrogation techniques" which several critics have labeled as torture. He publicly disagreed with President Bush's position against same-sex marriage in 2004, but also said it is "appropriately a matter for the states to decide".

Cheney, often cited as the most powerful vice president in American history, ended his tenure as an unpopular figure in American politics with an approval rating of 13 percent. His peak approval rating in the wake of the September 11 attacks was 68 percent.

Early life and education
Cheney was born in Lincoln, Nebraska, the son of Marjorie Lorraine (née Dickey) and Richard Herbert Cheney. He is of predominantly English, as well as Welsh, Irish, and French Huguenot ancestry. His father was a soil conservation agent for the U.S. Department of Agriculture and his mother was a softball star in the 1930s; Cheney was one of three children.
He attended Calvert Elementary School before his family moved to Casper, Wyoming, where he attended Natrona County High School.

He attended Yale University, but by his own account had problems adjusting to the college, and dropped out. Among the influential teachers from his days in New Haven was Professor H. Bradford Westerfield, whom Cheney repeatedly credited with having helped to shape his approach to foreign policy. He later attended the University of Wyoming, where he earned both a bachelor of arts and a master of arts in political science. He subsequently started, but did not finish, doctoral studies at the University of Wisconsin–Madison.

In November 1962, at the age of 21, Cheney was convicted of driving while intoxicated (DWI). He was arrested for DWI again the following year. Cheney said that the arrests made him "think about where I was and where I was headed. I was headed down a bad road if I continued on that course."

In 1964, he married Lynne Vincent, his high school sweetheart, whom he had met at age 14.

When Cheney became eligible for the draft, during the Vietnam War, he applied for and received five draft deferments. In 1989, The Washington Post writer George C. Wilson interviewed Cheney as the next Secretary of Defense; when asked about his deferments, Cheney reportedly said, "I had other priorities in the '60s than military service." Cheney testified during his confirmation hearings in 1989 that he received deferments to finish a college career that lasted six years rather than four, owing to sub-par academic performance and the need to work to pay for his education. Upon graduation, Cheney was eligible for the draft, but at the time, the Selective Service System was not inducting married men. On October 26, 1965, the draft was expanded to include married men without children; Cheney's first daughter, Elizabeth, was born 9 months and two days later. Cheney's fifth and final deferment granted him "3-A" status, a "hardship" deferment available to men with dependents. In January 1967, Cheney turned 26 and was no longer eligible for the draft.

In 1966 Cheney dropped out of the doctoral program at the University of Wisconsin to work as staff aide for Gov. Warren Knowles.

In 1968 Cheney was awarded an American Political Science Association congressional fellowship and moved to Washington.

Early career

Cheney's political career began in 1969, as an intern for Congressman William A. Steiger during the Richard Nixon Administration. He then joined the staff of Donald Rumsfeld, who was then Director of the Office of Economic Opportunity from 1969 to 1970. He held several positions in the years that followed: White House Staff Assistant in 1971, Assistant Director of the Cost of Living Council from 1971 to 1973, and Deputy Assistant to the president from 1974 to 1975. As deputy assistant, Cheney suggested several options in a memo to Rumsfeld, including use of the US Justice Department, that the Ford administration could use to limit damage from an article, published by The New York Times, in which investigative reporter Seymour Hersh reported that Navy submarines had tapped into Soviet undersea communications as part of a highly classified program, Operation Ivy Bells.

White House Chief of Staff 
Cheney was Assistant to the President and White House Deputy Chief of Staff under Gerald Ford from December 1974 to November 1975. When Rumsfeld was named Secretary of Defense, Cheney became White House Chief of Staff, succeeding Rumsfeld. He later was campaign manager for Ford's 1976 presidential campaign.

U.S. House of Representatives (1979–1989)

Elections
In 1978, Cheney was elected to represent Wyoming in the U.S. House of Representatives and succeeded retiring Democratic Congressman Teno Roncalio, having defeated his Democratic opponent, Bill Bagley. Cheney was re-elected five times, serving until 1989.

Tenure

Leadership
In 1987, he was elected Chairman of the House Republican Conference. The following year, he was elected House Minority Whip. He served for two and a half months before he was appointed Secretary of Defense instead of former U.S. Senator John G. Tower, whose nomination had been rejected by the U.S. Senate in March 1989.

Votes

He voted against the creation of the U.S. Department of Education, citing his concern over budget deficits and expansion of the federal government, and claiming that the Department was an encroachment on states' rights. He voted against funding Head Start, but reversed his position in 2000.

Cheney initially voted in 1978 against establishing a national holiday in honor of Martin Luther King Jr., but supported creation of Martin Luther King Jr. Day five years later, in 1983.

Cheney supported Bob Michel's (R-IL) bid to become Republican Minority Leader. In April 1980, Cheney endorsed Governor Ronald Reagan for president, becoming one of Reagan's earliest supporters.

In 1986, after President Ronald Reagan vetoed a bill to impose economic sanctions on South Africa for its policy of apartheid, Cheney was one of 83 Representatives to vote against overriding Reagan's veto. In later years, he articulated his opposition to unilateral sanctions against many different countries, stating "they almost never work" and that in that case they might have ended up hurting the people instead.

In 1986, Cheney, along with 145 Republicans and 31 Democrats, voted against a non-binding Congressional resolution calling on the South African government to release Nelson Mandela from prison, after the Democrats defeated proposed amendments that would have required Mandela to renounce violence sponsored by the African National Congress (ANC) and requiring it to oust the communist faction from its leadership; the resolution was defeated. Appearing on CNN, Cheney addressed criticism for this, saying he opposed the resolution because the ANC "at the time was viewed as a terrorist organization and had a number of interests that were fundamentally inimical to the United States."

Committee assignments
Originally declining, U.S. Congressman Barber Conable persuaded Cheney to join the moderate Republican Wednesday Group in order to move up the leadership ranks. He was elected Chairman of the Republican Policy Committee from 1981 to 1987. Cheney was the Ranking Member of the Select Committee to investigate the Iran-Contra Affair.
He promoted Wyoming's petroleum and coal businesses as well.

Secretary of Defense (1989–1993)

President George H. W. Bush nominated Cheney for the office of Secretary of Defense immediately after the U.S. Senate failed to confirm John Tower for that position. The senate confirmed Cheney by a vote of 92 to 0 and he served in that office from March 1989 to January 1993. He directed the United States invasion of Panama and Operation Desert Storm in the Middle East. In 1991, he was awarded the Presidential Medal of Freedom by Bush. Later that year, he received the U.S. Senator John Heinz Award for Greatest Public Service by an Elected or Appointed Official, an award given out annually by Jefferson Awards.

Cheney has said his time at the Pentagon was the most rewarding period of his public service career, calling it "the one that stands out." In 2014, Cheney recounted that when he met with President George H. W. Bush to accept the offer, he passed a painting in the private residence entitled The Peacemakers, which depicted President Lincoln, General Grant, and William Tecumseh Sherman. "My great-grandfather had served under William Tecumseh Sherman throughout the war," Cheney said, "and it occurred to me as I was in the room as I walked in to talk to the President about becoming Secretary of Defense, I wondered what he would have thought that his great-grandson would someday be in the White House with the President talking about taking over the reins of the U.S. military."

Early tenure
Cheney worked closely with Pete Williams, Assistant Secretary of Defense for Public Affairs, and Paul Wolfowitz, Under Secretary of Defense for Policy, from the beginning of his tenure. He focused primarily on external matters, and left most of the internal DoD management to Deputy Secretary of Defense Donald Atwood.

Budgetary practices
Cheney's most immediate issue as Secretary of Defense was the Department of Defense budget. Cheney deemed it appropriate to cut the budget and downsize the military, following the Reagan Administration's peacetime defense buildup at the height of the Cold War. As part of the fiscal year 1990 budget, Cheney assessed the requests from each of the branches of the armed services for such expensive programs as the Avenger II Naval attack aircraft, the B-2 stealth bomber, the V-22 Osprey tilt-wing helicopter, the Aegis destroyer and the MX missile, totaling approximately $4.5 billion in light of changed world politics. Cheney opposed the V-22 program, which Congress had already appropriated funds for, and initially refused to issue contracts for it before relenting.
When the 1990 Budget came before Congress in the summer of 1989, it settled on a figure between the Administration's request and the House Armed Services Committee's recommendation.

In subsequent years under Cheney, the proposed and adopted budgets followed patterns similar to that of 1990. Early in 1991, he unveiled a plan to reduce military strength by the mid-1990s to 1.6 million, compared with 2.2 million when he entered office. Cheney's 1993 defense budget was reduced from 1992, omitting programs that Congress had directed the Department of Defense to buy weapons that it did not want, and omitting unrequested reserve forces.

Over his four years as Secretary of Defense, Cheney downsized the military and his budgets showed negative real growth, despite pressures to acquire weapon systems advocated by Congress. The Department of Defense's total obligational authority in current dollars declined from $291 billion to $270 billion. Total military personnel strength decreased by 19 percent, from about 2.2 million in 1989 to about 1.8 million in 1993. Notwithstanding the overall reduction in military spending, Cheney directed the development of a Pentagon plan to ensure U.S. military dominance in the post-Cold War era.

Political climate and agenda
Cheney publicly expressed concern that nations such as Iraq, Iran, and North Korea, could acquire nuclear components after the collapse of the Soviet Union in 1991. The end of the Cold War, the fall of the Soviet Union, and the disintegration of the Warsaw Pact obliged the first Bush Administration to reevaluate the North Atlantic Treaty Organization's (NATO's) purpose and makeup. Cheney believed that NATO should remain the foundation of European security relationships and that it would remain important to the United States in the long term; he urged the alliance to lend more assistance to the new democracies in Eastern Europe.

Cheney's views on NATO reflected his skepticism about prospects for peaceful social development in the former Eastern Bloc countries, where he saw a high potential for political uncertainty and instability. He felt that the Bush Administration was too optimistic in supporting General Secretary of the CPSU Mikhail Gorbachev and his successor, Russian President Boris Yeltsin. Cheney worked to maintain strong ties between the United States and its European allies.

Cheney persuaded the Kingdom of Saudi Arabia to allow bases for U.S. ground troops and war planes in the nation. This was an important element of the success of the Gulf War, as well as a lightning-rod for Islamists, such as Osama bin Laden, who opposed having non-Muslim armies near their holy sites.

International situations
Using economic sanctions and political pressure, the United States mounted a campaign to drive Panamanian ruler General Manuel Antonio Noriega from power after he fell from favor. In May 1989, after Guillermo Endara had been duly elected President of Panama, Noriega nullified the election outcome, drawing intensified pressure. In October, Noriega suppressed a military coup, but in December, after soldiers of the Panamanian army killed a U.S. serviceman, the United States invasion of Panama began under Cheney's direction. The stated reason for the invasion was to seize Noriega to face drug charges in the United States, protect U.S. lives and property, and restore Panamanian civil liberties. Although the mission was controversial, U.S. forces achieved control of Panama and Endara assumed the presidency; Noriega was convicted and imprisoned on racketeering and drug trafficking charges in April 1992.

In 1991, the Somali Civil War drew the world's attention. In August 1992, the United States began to provide humanitarian assistance, primarily food, through a military airlift. At President Bush's direction, Cheney dispatched the first of 26,000 U.S. troops to Somalia as part of the Unified Task Force (UNITAF), designed to provide security and food relief. Cheney's successors as Secretary of Defense, Les Aspin and William J. Perry, had to contend with both the Bosnian and Somali issues.

Iraqi invasion of Kuwait
On August 1, 1990, Iraqi President Saddam Hussein sent the invading Iraqi forces into neighboring Kuwait, a small petroleum-rich state long claimed by Iraq as part of its territory. This invasion sparked the initiation of the Persian Gulf War and it brought worldwide condemnation. An estimated 140,000 Iraqi troops quickly took control of Kuwait City and moved on to the Saudi Arabia/Kuwait border. The United States had already begun to develop contingency plans for the defense of Saudi Arabia by the U.S. Central Command, headed by General Norman Schwarzkopf, because of its important petroleum reserves.

U.S. and world reaction

Cheney and Schwarzkopf oversaw planning for what would become a full-scale U.S. military operation. According to General Colin Powell, Cheney "had become a glutton for information, with an appetite we could barely satisfy. He spent hours in the National Military Command Center peppering my staff with questions."

Shortly after the Iraqi invasion, Cheney made the first of several visits to Saudi Arabia where King Fahd requested U.S. military assistance. The United Nations took action as well, passing a series of resolutions condemning Iraq's invasion of Kuwait; the UN Security Council authorized "all means necessary" to eject Iraq from Kuwait, and demanded that the country withdraw its forces by January 15, 1991. By then, the United States had a force of about 500,000 stationed in Saudi Arabia and the Persian Gulf. Other nations, including Britain, Canada, France, Italy, Syria, and Egypt, contributed troops, and other allies, most notably Germany and Japan, agreed to provide financial support for the coalition effort, named Operation Desert Shield.

On January 12, 1991, Congress authorized Bush to use military force to enforce Iraq's compliance with UN resolutions on Kuwait.

Military action
The first phase of Operation Desert Storm, which began on January 17, 1991, was an air offensive to secure air superiority and attack Iraqi forces, targeting key Iraqi command and control centers, including the cities of Baghdad and Basra. Cheney turned most other Department of Defense matters over to Deputy Secretary Atwood and briefed Congress during the air and ground phases of the war. He flew with Powell to the region to review and finalize the ground war plans.

After an air offensive of more than five weeks, Coalition forces launched the ground war on February 24. Within 100 hours, Iraqi forces had been routed from Kuwait and Schwarzkopf reported that the basic objectiveexpelling Iraqi forces from Kuwaithad been met on February 27. After consultation with Cheney and other members of his national security team, Bush declared a suspension of hostilities. On working with this national security team, Cheney has said, "there have been five Republican presidents since
Eisenhower. I worked for four of them and worked closely with a fifththe Reagan years when I was part of the House leadership. The best national security team I ever saw was that one. The least friction, the most cooperation, the highest degree of trust among the principals, especially."

Aftermath
A total of 147 U.S. military personnel died in combat, and another 236 died as a result of accidents or other causes. Iraq agreed to a formal truce on March 3, and a permanent cease-fire on April 6. There was subsequent debate about whether Coalition forces should have driven as far as Baghdad to oust Saddam Hussein from power. Bush agreed that the decision to end the ground war when they did was correct, but the debate persisted as Hussein remained in power and rebuilt his military forces. Arguably the most significant debate concerned whether U.S. and Coalition forces had left Iraq too soon. In an April 15, 1994, interview with C-SPAN, Cheney was asked if the U.S.-led Coalition forces should have moved into Baghdad. Cheney replied that occupying and attempting to take over the country would have been a "bad idea" and would have led to a "quagmire", explaining that:
[If] we'd gone to Baghdad we would have been all alone. There wouldn't have been anybody else with us. There would have been a U.S. occupation of Iraq. None of the Arab forces that were willing to fight with us in Kuwait were willing to invade Iraq. Once you got to Iraq and took it over, took down Saddam Hussein's government, then what are you going to put in its place? That's a very volatile part of the world, and if you take down the central government of Iraq, you could very easily end up seeing pieces of Iraq fly off: part of it, the Syrians would like to have to the west, part of iteastern Iraqthe Iranians would like to claim, they fought over it for eight years. In the north you've got the Kurds, and if the Kurds spin loose and join with the Kurds in Turkey, then you threaten the territorial integrity of Turkey. It's a quagmire if you go that far and try to take over Iraq. The other thing was casualties. Everyone was impressed with the fact we were able to do our job with as few casualties as we had. But for the 146 Americans killed in action, and for their familiesit wasn't a cheap war. And the question for the president, in terms of whether or not we went on to Baghdad, took additional casualties in an effort to get Saddam Hussein, was how many additional dead Americans is Saddam worth? Our judgment was, not very many, and I think we got it right.

Cheney regarded the Gulf War as an example of the kind of regional problem the United States was likely to continue to face in the future.
We're always going to have to be involved [in the Middle East]. Maybe it's part of our national character, you know we like to have these problems nice and neatly wrapped up, put a ribbon around it. You deploy a force, you win the war and the problem goes away. But it doesn't work that way in the Middle East. It never has, and isn't likely to in my lifetime.

Private sector career
Between 1987 and 1989, during his last term in Congress, Cheney served on the board of the Council on Foreign Relations foreign policy organization.

With the inauguration of the new Democratic administration under President Bill Clinton in January 1993, Cheney joined the American Enterprise Institute. He also served a second term as a Council on Foreign Relations director from 1993 to 1995.

From October 1, 1995 to July 25, 2000, he served as chairman of the board and chief executive officer of Halliburton, a Fortune 500 company. Cheney resigned as CEO on the same day he was announced as George Bush's vice presidential pick in the 2000 election.

Cheney's record as CEO was subject to some dispute among Wall Street analysts. A 1998 merger between Halliburton and Dresser Industries attracted the criticism of some Dresser executives for Halliburton's lack of accounting transparency. Halliburton shareholders pursued a class-action lawsuit alleging that the corporation artificially inflated its stock price during this period, though Cheney was not named as an individual defendant in the suit. In June 2011, the United States Supreme Court reversed a lower court ruling and allowed the case to continue in litigation. Cheney was named in a December 2010 corruption complaint filed by the Nigerian government against Halliburton, which the company settled for $250 million.

During Cheney's term, Halliburton changed its accounting practices regarding revenue realization of disputed costs on major construction projects. Cheney resigned as CEO of Halliburton on July 25, 2000. As vice president, he argued that this step, along with establishing a trust and other actions, removed any conflict of interest. Cheney's net worth, estimated to be between $19 million and $86 million,
is largely derived from his post at Halliburton.
His 2006 gross joint income with his wife was nearly $8.82 million.

He was also a member of the board of advisors of the Jewish Institute for National Security Affairs (JINSA) before becoming vice president.

2000 presidential election

In early 2000, while serving as the CEO of Halliburton, Cheney headed then-Governor of Texas George W. Bush's vice-presidential search committee. On July 25, after reviewing Cheney's findings, Bush surprised some pundits by asking Cheney himself to join the Republican ticket. Halliburton reportedly reached agreement on July 20 to allow Cheney to retire, with a package estimated at $20 million.

A few months before the election Cheney put his home in Dallas up for sale and changed his drivers' license and voter registration back to Wyoming. This change was necessary to allow Texas' presidential electors to vote for both Bush and Cheney without contravening the Twelfth Amendment to the United States Constitution, which forbids electors from voting for "an inhabitant of the same state with themselves" for both president and vice president.

Cheney campaigned against Al Gore's running mate, Joseph Lieberman, in the 2000 presidential election. While the election was undecided, the Bush-Cheney team was not eligible for public funding to plan a transition to a new administration, prompting Cheney to open a privately funded transition office in Washington. This office worked to identify candidates for all important positions in the cabinet. According to Craig Unger, Cheney advocated Donald Rumsfeld for the post of Secretary of Defense to counter the influence of Colin Powell at the State Department, and tried unsuccessfully to have Paul Wolfowitz named to replace George Tenet as director of the Central Intelligence Agency.

Vice presidency (2001–2009)

First term (2001–2005)

Following the September 11, 2001, attacks, Cheney remained physically apart from Bush for security reasons. For a period, Cheney stayed at a variety of undisclosed locations, out of public view. Cheney later revealed in his memoir In My Time that these "undisclosed locations" included his official vice presidential residence, his home in Wyoming, and Camp David. He also utilized a heavy security detail, employing a motorcade of 12 to 18 government vehicles for his daily commute from the vice presidential residence at the U.S. Naval Observatory to the White House.

On the morning of June 29, 2002, Cheney served as acting president from 7:09a.m. to 9:24a.m., under the terms of the 25th Amendment to the Constitution, while Bush underwent a colonoscopy.

Iraq War

Following 9/11, Cheney was instrumental in providing a primary justification for a renewed war against Iraq. Cheney helped shape Bush's approach to the "War on Terror", making numerous public statements alleging Iraq possessed weapons of mass destruction, and making several personal visits to CIA headquarters, where he questioned mid-level agency analysts on their conclusions. Cheney continued to allege links between Saddam Hussein and al-Qaeda, even though President Bush received a classified President's Daily Brief on September 21, 2001, indicating the U.S. intelligence community had no evidence linking Saddam Hussein to the September 11 attacks and that "there was scant credible evidence that Iraq had any significant collaborative ties with Al Qaeda." Furthermore, in 2004, the 9/11 Commission concluded that there was no "collaborative relationship" between Iraq and al-Qaeda. By 2014, Cheney continued to misleadingly claim that Saddam "had a 10-year relationship with al Qaeda."

Following the US invasion of Iraq, Cheney remained steadfast in his support of the war, stating that it would be an "enormous success story", and made many visits to the country. He often criticized war critics, calling them "opportunists" who were peddling "cynical and pernicious falsehoods" to gain political advantage while US soldiers died in Iraq. In response, Senator John Kerry asserted, "It is hard to name a government official with less credibility on Iraq [than Cheney]."

In a March 24, 2008, extended interview conducted in Ankara, Turkey, with ABC News correspondent Martha Raddatz on the fifth anniversary of the original U.S. military assault on Iraq, Cheney responded to a question about public opinion polls showing that Americans had lost confidence in the war by simply replying "So?" This remark prompted widespread criticism, including from former Oklahoma Republican Congressman Mickey Edwards, a long-time personal friend of Cheney.

Second term (2005–2009)

Bush and Cheney were re-elected in the 2004 presidential election, running against John Kerry and his running mate, John Edwards. During the election, the pregnancy of his daughter Mary and her sexual orientation as a lesbian became a source of public attention for Cheney in light of the same-sex marriage debate. Cheney has since stated that he is in favor of gay marriages personally, but that each individual U.S. state should decide whether to permit it or not.Cheney's former chief legal counsel, David Addington, became his chief of staff and remained in that office until Cheney's departure from office. John P. Hannah served as Cheney's national security adviser.
Until his indictment and resignation in 2005, I. Lewis "Scooter" Libby, Jr. served in both roles.

On the morning of July 21, 2007, Cheney once again served as acting president, from 7:16 am to 9:21 am. Bush transferred the power of the presidency prior to undergoing a medical procedure, requiring sedation, and later resumed his powers and duties that same day.

After his term began in 2001, Cheney was occasionally asked if he was interested in the Republican nomination for the 2008 elections. However, he always maintained that he wished to retire upon the expiration of his term and he did not run in the 2008 presidential primaries. The Republicans nominated Arizona Senator John McCain.

Disclosure of documents

Cheney was a prominent member of the National Energy Policy Development Group (NEPDG), commonly known as the Energy Task Force, composed of energy industry representatives, including several Enron executives. After the Enron scandal, the Bush administration was accused of improper political and business ties. In July 2003, the Supreme Court ruled that the US Department of Commerce must disclose NEPDG documents, containing references to companies that had made agreements with the previous Iraqi government to extract Iraq's petroleum.

Beginning in 2003, Cheney's staff opted not to file required reports with the National Archives and Records Administration office charged with assuring that the executive branch protects classified information, nor did it allow inspection of its record keeping.
Cheney refused to release the documents, citing his executive privilege to deny congressional information requests. Media outlets such as Time magazine and CBS News questioned whether Cheney had created a "fourth branch of government" that was not subject to any laws. A group of historians and open-government advocates filed a lawsuit in the US District Court for the District of Columbia, asking the court to declare that Cheney's vice-presidential records are covered by the Presidential Records Act of 1978 and cannot be destroyed, taken or withheld from the public without proper review.

CIA leak scandal

On October 18, 2005, The Washington Post reported that the vice president's office was central to the investigation of the Valerie Plame CIA leak scandal, for Cheney's former chief of staff, Lewis "Scooter" Libby, was one of the figures under investigation. Libby resigned his positions as Cheney's chief of staff and assistant on national security affairs later in the month after he was indicted.

In February 2006, The National Journal reported that Libby had stated before a grand jury that his superiors, including Cheney, had authorized him to disclose classified information to the press regarding intelligence on Iraq's weapons. That September, Richard Armitage, former Deputy Secretary of State, publicly announced that he was the source of the revelation of Plame's status. Armitage said he was not a part of a conspiracy to reveal Plame's identity and did not know whether one existed.

On March 6, 2007, Libby was convicted on four felony counts for obstruction of justice, perjury, and making false statements to federal investigators. In his closing arguments, independent prosecutor Patrick Fitzgerald said that there was "a cloud over the vice president", an apparent reference to Cheney's interview with FBI agents investigating the case, which was made public in 2009. Cheney lobbied President George W. Bush vigorously and unsuccessfully to grant Libby a full presidential pardon up to the day of Barack Obama's inauguration, likening Libby to a "soldier on the battlefield". Libby was subsequently pardoned by President Donald Trump in April 2018.

Assassination attempt

On February 27, 2007, at about 10 am, a suicide bomber killed 23 people and wounded 20 more outside Bagram Airfield in Afghanistan during a visit by Cheney. The Taliban claimed responsibility for the attack and declared that Cheney was its intended target. They also claimed that Osama bin Laden supervised the operation. The bomb went off outside the front gate while Cheney was inside the base and half a mile away. He reported hearing the blast, saying "I heard a loud boom... The Secret Service came in and told me there had been an attack on the main gate." The purpose of Cheney's visit to the region had been to press Pakistan for a united front against the Taliban.

Policy formulation

Cheney has been characterized as the most powerful and influential Vice President in history.
Both supporters and critics of Cheney regard him as a shrewd and knowledgeable politician who knows the functions and intricacies of the federal government. A sign of Cheney's active policy-making role was then-House Speaker Dennis Hastert's provision of an office near the House floor for Cheney in addition to his office in the West Wing, his ceremonial office in the Old Executive Office Building, and his Senate offices (one in the Dirksen Senate Office Building and another off the floor of the Senate).

Cheney has actively promoted an expansion of the powers of the presidency, saying that the Bush administration's challenges to the laws which Congress passed after Vietnam and Watergate to contain and oversee the executive branchthe Foreign Intelligence Surveillance Act, the Presidential Records Act, the Freedom of Information Act and the War Powers Resolutionare, in Cheney's words, "a restoration, if you will, of the power and authority of the president".

In June 2007, The Washington Post summarized Cheney's vice presidency in a Pulitzer Prize-winning
four-part series, based in part on interviews with former administration officials. The articles characterized Cheney not as a "shadow" president, but as someone who usually has the last words of counsel to the president on policies, which in many cases would reshape the powers of the presidency. When former Vice President Dan Quayle suggested to Cheney that the office was largely ceremonial, Cheney reportedly replied, "I have a different understanding with the president." The articles described Cheney as having a secretive approach to the tools of government, indicated by the use of his own security classification and three man-sized safes in his offices.

The articles described Cheney's influence on decisions pertaining to detention of suspected terrorists and the legal limits that apply to their questioning, especially what constitutes torture. U.S. Army Colonel Lawrence Wilkerson, who served as Colin Powell's chief of staff when he was both Chairman of the Joint Chiefs of Staff at the same time Cheney was Secretary of Defense, and then later when Powell was Secretary of State, stated in an in-depth interview that Cheney and Donald Rumsfeld established an alternative program to interrogate post-9/11 detainees because of their mutual distrust of CIA.

The Washington Post articles, principally written by Barton Gellman, further characterized Cheney as having the strongest influence within the administration in shaping budget and tax policy in a manner that assures "conservative orthodoxy." They also highlighted Cheney's behind-the-scenes influence on the Bush administration's environmental policy to ease pollution controls for power plants, facilitate the disposal of nuclear waste, open access to federal timber resources, and avoid federal constraints on greenhouse gas emissions, among other issues. The articles characterized his approach to policy formulation as favoring business over the environment.

In June 2008, Cheney allegedly attempted to block efforts by Secretary of State Condoleezza Rice to strike a controversial US compromise deal with North Korea over the communist state's nuclear program.

In July 2008, a former Environmental Protection Agency official stated publicly that Cheney's office had pushed significantly for large-scale deletions from a Centers for Disease Control and Prevention report on the health effects of global warming "fearing the presentation by a leading health official might make it harder to avoid regulating greenhouse gases." In October, when the report appeared with six pages cut from the testimony, the White House stated that the changes were made due to concerns regarding the accuracy of the science. However, according to the former senior adviser on climate change to Environmental Protection Agency Administrator Stephen Johnson, Cheney's office was directly responsible for nearly half of the original testimony being deleted.

In his role as President of the U.S. Senate, Cheney broke with the Bush Administration Department of Justice, and signed an amicus brief to the United States Supreme Court in the case of Heller v. District of Columbia that successfully challenged gun laws in the nation's capital on Second Amendment grounds.

On February 14, 2010, in an appearance on ABC's This Week, Cheney reiterated his support of waterboarding and for the torture of captured terrorist suspects, saying, "I was and remain a strong proponent of our enhanced interrogation program."

Post–vice presidency (2009–present)
The Washington Post reported in 2008 that Cheney purchased a home in McLean, Virginia, part of the Washington suburbs, which he was to tear down for a replacement structure. He also maintains homes in Wyoming and on Maryland's Eastern Shore.

Political activity

In July 2012, Cheney used his Wyoming home to host a private fund-raiser for Republican presidential candidate Mitt Romney, which netted over $4 million in contributions from attendees for Romney's campaign.

Cheney is the subject of the documentary film The World According to Dick Cheney, which premiered March 15, 2013, on the Showtime television channel. Cheney was also reported to be the subject of an HBO television mini-series based on Barton Gellman's 2008 book Angler and the 2006 documentary The Dark Side, produced by the Public Broadcasting Service.

Cheney maintained a visible public profile after leaving office, being especially critical of Obama administration policies on national security. In May 2009, Cheney spoke of his support for same-sex marriage, becoming one of the most prominent Republican politicians to do so. Speaking to the National Press Club, Cheney stated: "People ought to be free to enter into any kind of union they wish, any kind of arrangement they wish. I do believe, historically, the way marriage has been regulated is at a state level. It's always been a state issue, and I think that's the way it ought to be handled today." In 2012, Cheney reportedly encouraged several Maryland state legislators to vote to legalize same-sex marriage in that state.

Although, by custom, a former vice president unofficially receives six months of protection from the United States Secret Service, President Obama reportedly extended the protection period for Cheney.

On July 11, 2009, CIA Director Leon Panetta told the Senate and House intelligence committees that the CIA withheld information about a secret counter-terrorism program from Congress for eight years on direct orders from Cheney. Intelligence and Congressional officials have said the unidentified program did not involve the CIA interrogation program and did not involve domestic intelligence activities. They have said the program was started by the counter-terrorism center at the CIA shortly after the attacks of September 11, 2001, but never became fully operational, involving planning and some training that took place off and on from 2001 until 2009. The Wall Street Journal reported, citing former intelligence officials familiar with the matter, that the program was an attempt to carry out a 2001 presidential authorization to capture or kill al Qaeda operatives.

Cheney has said that the Tea Party Movement is a "positive influence on the Republican Party" and that "I think it's much better to have that kind of turmoil and change in the Republican Party than it would be to have it outside."

In May 2016, Cheney endorsed Donald Trump as the Republican nominee in the 2016 presidential election. That November, his daughter Liz won election to the House of Representatives (to his former congressional seat). When she was sworn into office in January 2017, Cheney said he believed she would do well in the position and that he would only offer advice if requested.

That March, Cheney said that Russian interference in the 2016 United States elections could be considered "an act of war".

Views on President Obama
On December 29, 2009, four days after the attempted bombing of an international passenger flight from the Netherlands to United States, Cheney criticized President Barack Obama: "[We] are at war and when President Obama pretends we aren't, it makes us less safe. ... Why doesn't he want to admit we're at war? It doesn't fit with the view of the world he brought with him to the Oval Office. It doesn't fit with what seems to be the goal of his presidencysocial transformationthe restructuring of American society." In response, White House Communications Director Dan Pfeiffer wrote on the official White House blog the following day, "[I]t is telling that Vice President Cheney and others seem to be more focused on criticizing the Administration than condemning the attackers. Unfortunately too many are engaged in the typical Washington game of pointing fingers and making political hay, instead of working together to find solutions to make our country safer."

During a February 14, 2010, appearance on ABC's This Week, Cheney reiterated his criticism of the Obama administration's policies for handling suspected terrorists, criticizing the "mindset" of treating "terror attacks against the United States as criminal acts as opposed to acts of war".

In a May 2, 2011, interview with ABC News, Cheney praised the Obama administration for the covert military operation in Pakistan that resulted in the death of Osama bin Laden.

In 2014, during an interview with Sean Hannity, he called Obama a "weak President" after Obama announced his plans to pull forces out of Afghanistan.

Memoir

In August 2011, Cheney published his memoir, In My Time: A Personal and Political Memoir, written with Liz Cheney. The book outlines Cheney's recollections of 9/11, the War on Terrorism, the 2001 War in Afghanistan, the run-up to the 2003 Iraq War, so-called "enhanced interrogation techniques" and other events. According to Barton Gellman, the author of Angler: The Cheney Vice Presidency, Cheney's book differs from publicly available records on details surrounding the NSA surveillance program.

Exceptional: Why the World Needs a Powerful America

In 2015, Cheney published another book, Exceptional: Why the World Needs a Powerful America, again co-authored with his daughter Liz. The book traces the history of U.S. foreign policy and military successes and failures from Franklin Roosevelt's administration through the Obama administration. The authors tell the story of what they describe as the unique role the United States has played as a defender of freedom throughout the world since World War II. Drawing upon the notion of American exceptionalism, the co-authors criticize Barack Obama's and former Secretary of State Hillary Clinton's foreign policies, and offer what they see as the solutions needed to restore American greatness and power on the world stage in defense of freedom.

Views on Donald Trump
Cheney has criticized modern Republican leadership.

In May 2016, Cheney said he would support Donald Trump in the 2016 presidential election. In May 2018, Cheney supported President Trump's decision to withdraw from the Iran Nuclear Deal.

He criticized the Trump administration during a forum at the American Enterprise Institute alongside Vice President Mike Pence in March 2019. Questioning his successor on Trump's commitment to NATO and tendency to announce policy decisions on Twitter before consulting senior staff members, Cheney went on to opine, "It seems, at times, as though your administration’s approach has more in common with Obama’s foreign policy than traditional Republican foreign policy."

On the one year anniversary of the January 6, 2021, Capitol attack, Cheney joined his daughter Liz Cheney at the Capitol and participated in the remembrance events. He later appeared in a 2022 primary campaign ad for Liz in which he called Trump a "coward" and "threat to our republic" due to his attempts to overturn the 2020 United States presidential election. That year, Liz ran for her Wyoming congressional seat against Trump-backed primary challenger Harriet Hageman, who ultimately won.

Public perception and legacy
Cheney's early public opinion polls were more favorable than unfavorable, reaching his peak approval rating in the wake of the September 11 attacks at 68 percent. However, polling numbers for both him and the president gradually declined in their second terms, with Cheney reaching his lowest point shortly before leaving office at 13 percent. Cheney's Gallup poll figures are mostly consistent with those from other polls:
 April 2001 – 63% approval, 21% disapproval
 January 2002 – 68% approval, 18% disapproval
 January 2004 – 56% approval, 36% disapproval
 January 2005 – 50% approval, 40% disapproval
 January 2006 – 41% approval, 46% disapproval
 July 2007 – 30% approval, 60% disapproval
 March 2009 – 30% approval, 63% disapproval

In April 2007, Cheney was awarded an honorary doctorate of public service by Brigham Young University, where he delivered the commencement address. His selection as commencement speaker was controversial. The college board of trustees issued a statement explaining that the invitation should be viewed "as one extended to someone holding the high office of vice president of the United States rather than to a partisan political figure". BYU permitted a protest to occur so long as it did not "make personal attacks against Cheney, attack (the) BYU administration, the church or the First Presidency".

Cheney has been cited as the most powerful vice president in American history. He has been compared to Darth Vader, a characterization originated by his critics, but which was later adopted humorously by Cheney himself as well as by members of his family and staff.

As a result of Cheney having admitted that he "signed off" on the so-called "enhanced interrogation techniques" program, some public officials, as well as several media outlets and advocacy groups, have called for his prosecution under various anti-torture and war crimes statutes.

In Jon Meacham's book Destiny and Power: The American Odyssey of George Herbert Walker Bush, published in November 2015, the 41st president, although also laudatory of Cheney, is in part critical of the former vice president, whom Bush describes as "having his own empire" and "very hard-line."

The federal building in Casper, Wyoming is named the Dick Cheney Federal Building.

In popular culture 
 In Eminem's 2002 single "Without Me", where the lines "I know that you got a job, Ms. Cheney / But your husband's heart problem's complicating" refer to his health problems.
 In The Day After Tomorrow, the character Raymond Becker (played by Kenneth Welsh) is intended to be a criticism of Dick Cheney.
 In W. (2008), a biographical comedy-drama film directed by Oliver Stone, he is portrayed by Richard Dreyfuss.
In War Dogs (2016 film) where the line "God bless Dick Cheney's America" refers to his support of American military presence in Iraq.
 In Who Is America? (2018), a political satire series, Sacha Baron Cohen pranked Cheney into signing a makeshift waterboard kit.
 In Vice (2018), a biographical comedy-drama film written and directed by Adam McKay, Cheney is portrayed by Christian Bale, for which the latter won a Golden Globe and was nominated for the Academy Award for Best Actor. 
 In Mrs. America (2020), a historical drama television miniseries produced by FX, Cheney is portrayed by Andrew Hodwitz.
 Bob Rivers did a parody cover called "Cheney's Got a Gun"

Personal life
Cheney is a member of the United Methodist Church and was the first Methodist vice president to serve under a Methodist president.

Cheney's brother, Bob, is a former civil servant at the Bureau of Land Management.

His wife, Lynne, was chair of the National Endowment for the Humanities from 1986 to 1996. She is now a public speaker, author, and a senior fellow at the American Enterprise Institute.

The couple have two daughters, Elizabeth ("Liz") and Mary Cheney, and seven grandchildren. Liz, a former congresswoman from Wyoming, is married to Philip J. Perry, a former General Counsel of the Department of Homeland Security. Mary, a former employee of the Colorado Rockies baseball team and the Coors Brewing Company, was a campaign aide to the Bush re-election campaign; she lives in Great Falls, Virginia, with her wife Heather Poe. Cheney has publicly supported gay marriage since leaving the vice presidency.

As of 2015, Cheney had a pet Golden Retriever named Nelson.

Health problems
Cheney's long histories of cardiovascular disease and periodic need for urgent health care raised questions of whether he was medically fit to serve in public office. Having smoked approximately 3 packs of cigarettes per day for nearly 20 years, Cheney had his first of five heart attacks on June 18, 1978, at age 37. Subsequent heart attacks in 1984, 1988, on November 22, 2000, and on February 22, 2010, resulted in moderate contractile dysfunction of his left ventricle. He underwent four-vessel coronary artery bypass grafting in 1988, coronary artery stenting in November 2000, urgent coronary balloon angioplasty in March 2001, and the implantation of a cardioverter-defibrillator in June 2001.

On September 24, 2005, Cheney underwent a six-hour endo-vascular procedure to repair popliteal artery aneurysms bilaterally, a catheter treatment technique used in the artery behind each knee. The condition was discovered at a regular physical in July, and was not life-threatening. Cheney was hospitalized for tests after experiencing shortness of breath five months later. In late April 2006, an ultrasound revealed that the clot was smaller.

On March 5, 2007, Cheney was treated for deep-vein thrombosis in his left leg at George Washington University Hospital after experiencing pain in his left calf. Doctors prescribed blood-thinning medication and allowed him to return to work. CBS News reported that during the morning of November 26, 2007, Cheney was diagnosed with atrial fibrillation and underwent treatment that afternoon.

On July 12, 2008, Cheney underwent a cardiological exam; doctors reported that his heartbeat was normal for a 67-year-old man with a history of heart problems. As part of his annual checkup, he was administered an electrocardiogram and radiological imaging of the stents placed in the arteries behind his knees in 2005. Doctors said that Cheney had not experienced any recurrence of atrial fibrillation and that his special pacemaker had neither detected nor treated any arrhythmia. On October 15, 2008, Cheney returned to the hospital briefly to treat a minor irregularity.

On January 19, 2009, Cheney strained his back "while moving boxes into his new house". As a consequence, he was in a wheelchair for two days, including his attendance at the 2009 United States presidential inauguration.

On February 22, 2010, Cheney was admitted to George Washington University Hospital after experiencing chest pains. A spokesperson later said Cheney had experienced a mild heart attack after doctors had run tests. On June 25, 2010, Cheney was admitted to George Washington University Hospital after reporting discomfort.

In early-July 2010, Cheney was outfitted with a left-ventricular assist device (LVAD) at Inova Fairfax Heart and Vascular Institute to compensate for worsening congestive heart failure. The device pumped blood continuously through his body. He was released from Inova on August 9, 2010, and had to decide whether to seek a full heart transplant.
This pump was centrifugal and as a result he remained alive without a pulse for nearly fifteen months.

On March 24, 2012, Cheney underwent a seven-hour heart transplant procedure at Inova Fairfax Hospital in Woodburn, Virginia. He had been on a waiting list for more than 20 months before receiving the heart from an anonymous donor. Cheney's principal cardiologist, Dr. Jonathan Reiner, advised his patient that "it would not be unreasonable for an otherwise healthy 71-year-old man to expect to live another 10 years" with a transplant, saying in a family-authorized interview that he considered Cheney to be otherwise healthy.

Hunting incident

On February 11, 2006, Cheney accidentally shot Harry Whittington, a then-78-year-old Texas attorney, while participating in a quail hunt at Armstrong ranch in Kenedy County, Texas. Secret Service agents and medical aides, who were traveling with Cheney, came to Whittington's assistance and treated his birdshot wounds to his right cheek, neck, and chest. An ambulance standing by for the Vice President took Whittington to nearby Kingsville before he was flown by helicopter to Corpus Christi Memorial Hospital. On February 14, 2006, Whittington had a non-fatal heart attack and atrial fibrillation due to at least one lead-shot pellet lodged in or near his heart. Because of the small size of the birdshot pellets, doctors decided to leave up to 30 pieces of the pellets lodged in his body rather than try to remove them.

The Secret Service stated that they notified the sheriff about one hour after the shooting. Kenedy County Sheriff Ramone Salinas III stated that he first heard of the shooting at about 5:30 pm. The next day, ranch owner Katharine Armstrong informed the Corpus Christi Caller-Times of the shooting. Cheney had a televised interview with MSNBC News about the shooting on February 15. Both Cheney and Whittington have called the incident an accident. Early reports indicated that Cheney and Whittington were friends and that the injuries were minor. Whittington has since told The Washington Post that he and Cheney were not close friends but acquaintances. When asked if Cheney had apologized, Whittington declined to answer.

Armstrong, the ranch owner, claimed that all in the hunting party were wearing blaze-orange safety gear and none had been drinking. However, Cheney has acknowledged that he had one beer four or five hours prior to the shooting. Although Kenedy County Sheriff's Office documents support the official story by Cheney and his party, re-creations of the incident produced by George Gongora and John Metz of the Corpus Christi Caller-Times indicated that the actual shooting distance was closer than the 30 yards claimed.

The incident hurt Cheney's popularity standing in the polls. According to polls on February 27, 2006, two weeks after the accident, Dick Cheney's approval rating had dropped 5 percentage points to 18%. The incident became the subject of a number of jokes and satire.

Works
 "A Comparative Analysis of Senate–House Voting on Economic and Welfare Policy, 1953–1964," American Political Science Review, Vol. 64, Issue 1 (March 1970), pp. 138–152. Co-authored with Aage R. Clausen.
 Exceptional: Why the World Needs a Powerful America with Liz Cheney. New York: Simon & Schuster. 2015. .

Notes

References

Bibliography
 
 
 
 
 Goldstein, Joel K. "The contemporary presidency: Cheney, vice presidential power, and the war on terror." Presidential Studies Quarterly 40.1 (2010): 102–139. online

External links

 
 
 US Department of State from the Internet Archive
  The New York Times – Dick Cheney archives

 
1941 births
Living people
2000 United States vice-presidential candidates
2004 United States vice-presidential candidates
20th-century American businesspeople
20th-century American male writers
20th-century American non-fiction writers
20th-century American politicians
20th-century Methodists
21st-century American male writers
21st-century American non-fiction writers
21st-century Methodists
21st-century vice presidents of the United States
Acting presidents of the United States
American chief executives of energy companies
American Enterprise Institute
American hunters
American male non-fiction writers
American memoirists
American people of English descent
American people of French descent
American people of Welsh descent
American political writers
American United Methodists
Dick
Ford administration personnel
George H. W. Bush administration cabinet members
George W. Bush administration cabinet members
Grand Cordons of the Order of the Rising Sun
Halliburton people
Heart transplant recipients
People associated with the September 11 attacks
People from Jackson, Wyoming
Politicians from Casper, Wyoming
Politicians from Lincoln, Nebraska
Presidential Medal of Freedom recipients
Republican Party (United States) vice presidential nominees
Republican Party members of the United States House of Representatives from Wyoming
Republican Party vice presidents of the United States
Texas Republicans
United States Secretaries of Defense
United States congressional aides
University of Wyoming alumni
Vice presidents of the United States
White House Chiefs of Staff
White House Deputy Chiefs of Staff
Writers from Lincoln, Nebraska
Writers from Wyoming